Redwood High School is an alternative/continuation public high school in Castro Valley, California, United States. It is the only alternative/continuation high school in Castro Valley, and is one of only two high schools in Castro Valley, the other being Castro Valley High School. Redwood High School was remodeled from 2006 to 2008.

References

External links 
 Public School Review page
 

Educational institutions in the United States with year of establishment missing
High schools in Alameda County, California
Public high schools in California